Katherine Sherar Pannill Center (born March 4, 1972) is an American author of contemporary fiction.

Early life and education
Center was born and raised in Afton Oaks, Houston, Texas. She graduated from St. John's School and from Vassar College. She won the Vassar College Fiction Prize while a student. She received her M.A. in fiction from the University of Houston, where she was the co-editor of the literary fiction magazine, Gulf Coast. Her graduate thesis, Peepshow, a collection of stories, was a finalist for the Mary McCarthy Prize in Short Fiction. She has two sisters, one of which is U.S. Representative Lizzie Fletcher.

Career
Center is the author of several books, which she has called "bittersweet comic novels." Her first novel, The Bright Side of Disaster (2006), was optioned by Varsity Pictures, and her sixth, How to Walk Away (2018), was a New York Times bestseller and Book of the Month Club pick for May 2018 and a Target Book Club pick for July 2019. Center's 2019 novel Things You Save in a Fire was New York Times bestseller, and a Book of the Month Club pick for July 2019. Her 2022 novel, The Bodyguard debuted at #11 on the New York Times bestseller list, #35 on the USA Today bestseller list, and it was a Book of the Month Club pick for July 2022.

Along with Jeffrey Toobin and Douglas Brinkley, Center was one of the speakers at the 2007 Houston Chronicle Book and Author Dinner.

Center has published essays in Real Simple and the anthologies Because I Love Her, CRUSH: 26 Real-Life Tales of First Love, and My Parents Were Awesome.

Center also makes video essays, one of which, a letter to her daughter about motherhood, became the very popular Defining a Movement video for the Mom 2.0 conference. Center spoke at the 2018 TEDx Bend. Her talk was called "We Need to Teach Boys to Read Stories About Girls".

In 2020, a film adaptation of her novel The Lost Husband was released. In 2021, an adaptation of her 2015 novel, Happiness For Beginners was filmed for Netflix starring Ellie Kemper and Luke Grimes for release in 2022.

Books 

 The Bright Side of Disaster (2006) 
 Everyone is Beautiful (2009)
 Get Lucky (2010)
 The Lost Husband (2013)
 Happiness for Beginners (2015)
 How to Walk Away (2018)
 Things You Save in a Fire (2019)
 What You Wish For (2020)
 The Bodyguard (2022)

References

External links
 Katherine Center's website
 Random House profile
 MacMillan author page
 IMDB listing

1972 births
Living people
21st-century American novelists
American chick lit writers
University of Houston alumni
Vassar College alumni
American women novelists
21st-century American women writers
St. John's School (Texas) alumni